S'arrive Lobo Badiambila (born 8 August 1996) is a DR Congolese footballer who plays for Tanzanian club Simba Queens and the DR Congo women's national team.

Club career
Badiambila has played for DCMP/Bikira in the Democratic Republic of the Congo.

International career
Badiambila capped for the DR Congo at senior level during the 2020 CAF Women's Olympic Qualifying Tournament (third round).

See also
 List of Democratic Republic of the Congo women's international footballers

References

1996 births
Living people
Democratic Republic of the Congo women's footballers
Women's association footballers not categorized by position
Simba S.C. players
Democratic Republic of the Congo women's international footballers
Democratic Republic of the Congo expatriate footballers
Democratic Republic of the Congo expatriate sportspeople in Tanzania
Expatriate women's footballers in Tanzania